Conoho Creek Historic District is a national historic district located near Hassell, Martin County, North Carolina.  The district encompasses 77 contributing buildings, 6 contributing site, 5 contributing structures, and 2 contributing objects in a rural agricultural and woodland area of Martin County.  They include notable examples of Federal, Georgian, and Greek Revival architecture in buildings dated from the early-19th century through the 1940s.  Notable contributing resources include the Outterbridge-Everett Farm, Outterbridge-Briley-Purvis house, the Sherrod-Best-Fleming Farm, the Ballard-Hyman-Thomas Farm, the Ballard-Salsbury-Eubanks Farm, the Cherry-Council House, and the Haislip House.

It was listed on the National Register of Historic Places in 1998.

References

Historic districts on the National Register of Historic Places in North Carolina
Georgian architecture in North Carolina
Federal architecture in North Carolina
Greek Revival architecture in North Carolina
Buildings and structures in Martin County, North Carolina
National Register of Historic Places in Martin County, North Carolina